The 1998 Women's World Water Polo Championship was the fourth edition of the women's water polo tournament at the World Aquatics Championships, organised by the world governing body in aquatics, the FINA. The tournament was held from 8 to 16 January 1998 in the Challenge Stadium, and was incorporated into the 1998 World Aquatics Championships in Perth, Western Australia.

Teams

Group A
 
 
 
 
 
 

Group B

Preliminary round

Group A

Group B

Quarter finals
 Wednesday January 14, 1998

Semi finals
 Thursday January 15, 1998

Finals

Placing matches
 Thursday January 15, 1998 — 11th place

 Thursday January 15, 1998 — 9th place

 Friday January 16, 1998 — 7th place

 Friday January 16, 1998 — 5th place

Bronze medal match
 Friday January 16, 1998

Final
 Friday January 16, 1998

Final ranking

Medalists

Individual awards

 Most Valuable Player
 ???

 Best Goalkeeper
 ???

 Topscorer
 Karin Kuipers – Netherlands

References

 Results

1998
Women's tournament
1998 in women's water polo
Women's water polo in Australia
1998 in Australian women's sport